Nikolai Dmitrievich Brashman (June 14, 1796 – ) was a Russian mathematician of Jewish-Austrian origin. He was a student of Joseph Johann Littrow, and the advisor of Pafnuty Chebyshev and August Davidov.

He was born in Neu-Raußnitz (today Rousínov in Czech Republic, then in Austrian Empire) and studied at the University of Vienna and Vienna Polytechnic Institute. In 1824 he moved to Saint Petersburg and then accepted a position at the Kazan University. In 1834 he became a professor of applied mathematics at the Moscow University. There he is best remembered as a founder of the Moscow Mathematical Society and its journal Matematicheskii Sbornik.

For his mechanics textbook, in 1836 Brashman was awarded the Demidov Prize by the Russian Academy of Sciences. The academy elected him a corresponding member in 1855. He died in Moscow in 1866.

References

Bibliography
 

1796 births
1866 deaths
Russian Jews
People from Rousínov
Moravian Jews
19th-century mathematicians from the Russian Empire
Corresponding members of the Saint Petersburg Academy of Sciences
Demidov Prize laureates
University of Vienna alumni
TU Wien alumni
Professorships at the Imperial Moscow University